Simon Toulson-Clarke is the English lead singer and a founder member of the 1980s/1990s pop group Red Box. He was educated at Harrow School and in the late 1970s, he studied in London at the Polytechnic of Central London where he formed the band along with Julian Close, Paddy Talbot, Rob Legge and Martin Nickson.

He released an album in 1997 with Alastair Gavin and Phill Brown titled SPA, which was a tribute to American comic Bill Hicks. In 2010, a third Red Box album was released, titled Plenty. Toulson-Clarke and fellow band members Derek Adams, Paul Bond, Dave Jenkins, Sally Jo-Seery and Karin Tenggren are currently in the studio recording a new album.

References

External links

Living people
People educated at Harrow School
People from London
Musicians from London
English male singers
English new wave musicians
1961 births